Urzejowice  (Uzheyovychi) is a village in the administrative district of Gmina Przeworsk, within Przeworsk County, Subcarpathian Voivodeship, in south-eastern Poland.

The village has a population of 1,800.

See also
 Walddeutsche

References

Urzejowice